The Minders are an American band closely associated with The Elephant Six Collective.  Started by Martyn Leaper in Denver, Colorado in 1996, the band's original members included Leaper on guitars and vocals, Rebecca Cole, on drums, Jeff Almond on guitar, and Marc Willhite on bass.

Leaper formed the Minders in Denver along with Robert Schneider and Hilarie Sidney from The Apples in Stereo. Together they recorded Paper Plane EP in Athens, Georgia. Leaper recorded the "Come On & Hear 7" in Denver, Colorado, allegedly one of the fastest selling Elephant 6 releases in history.  At this time, Leaper began attempting to form a more permanent band after releasing "Paper Plane" on 7".

With a permanent lineup set, the band was able to release Rocket 58 as an EP and sign to spinART Records, who released their first album Hooray for Tuesday in 1998.  Touring and the release of some other singles ensued, and the band split, with Leaper and Cole moving from Denver to Portland, OR and recruiting future Jicks bassist Joanna Bolme.  The minor upheaval resulted in the eventual release of Cul-De-Sacs And Dead Ends, a compilation of singles and b-sides.

Bolme left the Minders shortly after the release of the band's second proper album, Golden Street, in 2001.  Almond and Willhite regrouped with the band in time to release their third album in 2002, The Future's Always Perfect.

In the spring of 2008, Cole left the band.

In 2016, The Minders released Into the River on Space Cassette.

Discography
The Minders have released their albums on spinART, but have also released a number of EPs and singles on a variety of record labels.

Albums
 Hooray for Tuesday - spinART - 1998
 Cul-De-Sacs and Dead Ends - spinART - 1999
 Golden Street - spinART - 2001
 The Future's Always Perfect - Future Farmer - 2003
 The Stolen Boy - self-released tour-only CD - 2004
 It's a Bright Guilty World - Future Farmer - 2006
 Cul-De-Sacs and Dead Ends vol 2 - Dirigeable Recordings - 2012
  Into the River - Space Cassette - 2016
  Psychedelic Blacktop - Space Cassette - 2022

Singles and EPs
 "Come On & Hear" (7") - Elephant 6 - 1996
 "Paper Plane" (7") - Elephant 6 - 1996
 "Rocket 58" (7") - 100 Guitar Mania - 1997
 "Black Balloon" (7") Little Army - 1998
 "Right As Rain" (7") Earworm - 1999
 Down in Fall (CD) - spinART - 2000
 Split w/ Tobin Sprout (7") - Sprite Recordings - 2002
 "Live at KPSU" (7") - Dirigeable Records - 2002
 "Tearaway" (7") - Omnibus Records - 2003
 Split w/ The Zebras (7") - Low Transit Industries - 2003
 "It's Going To Break Out" (7"/Digital Download) - Dirigeable / Space Cassette - 2013

References

External links

The Elephant 6 Recording Company artists
Indie rock musical groups from Colorado
Indie rock musical groups from Oregon
Musical groups from Denver
Musical groups from Portland, Oregon
1996 establishments in Oregon
Musical groups established in 1996
Low Transit Industries artists
SpinART Records artists